WNOX (93.1 FM, "Awesome 93.1") is a commercial radio station licensed to the suburb of Karns, Tennessee, and serving the Knoxville metropolitan area.  The station is owned by SummitMedia and airs a classic hits format.

WNOX's studios and offices are on Amherst Road in Knoxville. The transmitter is off Vance Lane, also in Knoxville.

History
On October 3, 1988, the station first signed on under the call sign WCKS.   The station was owned by Bill Strelitz and it aired an adult contemporary format.

The station switched call signs to WWZZ on December 3, 1990.

WWST and WMYU frequency swap
On May 20, 1994, 93.1 FM changed to Star 93.1 FM with the call sign WWST. The format remained Top 40. 

On March 9, 2001 WWST and sister station WMYU (Oldies 102) swapped frequencies bringing "WMYU" to 93.1 FM while the WWST call letters were moved to 102.1 FM as Star 102.1.  WMYU broadcast an 80's format known as "931 The Point", until November 26, 2008, when the station switched to a country music format as Q93 switching its call sign to WCYQ. On May 9, 2013, WCYQ changed its call letters to WNOX, swapping calls with WNOX 100.3 FM Oak Ridge, Tennessee, which took the WCYQ calls.

On May 23, 2013 WNOX split from its simulcast with country-formatted WCYQ 100.3 FM Oak Ridge.  WNOX changed its format to classic hits, branded as "Classic Hits 93.1". From November 15, 2019 until December 25, 2019, it switched to all Christmas music. The brand was modified to "Knoxville's Greatest Hits" on December 25, 2019. On April 12, 2021 WNOX rebranded as "Awesome 93.1".

Journal Communications and the E. W. Scripps Company announced on July 30, 2014 that the two companies would merge to create a new broadcast company under the E.W. Scripps Company name that owned the two companies' broadcast properties, including WNOX. The transaction was completed in 2015, pending shareholder and regulatory approvals. Scripps exited radio in 2018; the Knoxville stations went to SummitMedia in a four-market, $47 million deal completed on November 1, 2018.

Previous logo

References

External links
WNOX official website
93.1 WNOX facebook

NOX
Classic hits radio stations in the United States
Radio stations established in 1988
1988 establishments in Tennessee